Vanderbilt Club was one of the earliest bidding systems in the game of contract bridge. It was devised by Harold S. Vanderbilt, who had in 1925 devised the game itself. It was published by him in 1929. It was the first strong club system. An updated version was published in 1964. As of 2017, it has long been obsolete.

Overview
In the Vanderbilt Club system, an opening bid of 1 is artificial  and forcing, and shows a good hand. A response of 1 is an artificial negative. Other bids are "regulation bids".  The system was published by Harold S. Vanderbilt in his 1929 book Contract Bridge. It was the first strong club system. An updated version was published in 1964.

Vanderbilt was a very early bridge theorist, because in his 1929 book he explained in detail the reasoning upon which his system was based: "In many Contract hands it is essential that an original bidder be assured of a second opportunity to bid".

1929 system
The Official Encyclopedia of Bridge has called Vanderbilt's 1929 book one which "made a major contribution to the technical development of the game".

Uncontested auctions
Vanderbilt defines the potential of bridge hands in terms of quick tricks.   In summary, Vanderbilt Club is:

 1artificial, at least 3 quick tricks 
 1 responseartificial, fewer than 2 quick tricks
 Other responses (including 2)regulation, at least 2 quick tricks
 1regulation, fewer than 3 quick tricks
 1Nat least Ax, Kx, Qx or J9xx in all suits 
 2regulation; like 1, but displaced one level higher because 1 is artificial
 2Vanderbilt's examples have a 6- or 7-card suit with 2 high honors and 9–11 HCP
 2NVanderbilt's only example is a balanced hand with 20 HCP and stoppers in all suits
 3AKQJxx and some outside values, or AKQxxxx and few outside values
 3similar to 3, except that the suit need not be solid
 3Nnot recommended
 4long strong non-solid suit, outside values, inviting a raise to game

Contested auctions

Vanderbilt distinguishes between informatory doubles and business doubles, two expressions known from auction bridge. Doubles should be informatory at the one-level; at the two-level if neither you nor your partner has previously bid; and perhaps at the three-level, depending on the player's judgment of the score and the bidding. Doubles should be made more freely in contract than in auction bridge, because the potential profit is greater.

Vanderbilt does not otherwise discuss bidding in contested auctions.

Slam bidding

Vanderbilt describes three types of invitations to slam: bidding more than is needed to score game; bidding the opponents' suit; and introducing another strain after the partnership has agreed a strain.

He also says that some slams should be bid on the first round of bidding, because of the risk that partner might pass any lower bid.

Bluff bidding
The expression psychic bidding is attached to Dorothy Rice Sims, who coined the expression in the 1930s. Vanderbilt described a similar type of maneuver as being known in 1929, but did not advocate it.

Goulashes

A goulash is a variant of bridge in which the cards are not properly shuffled and are dealt several at a time. Vanderbilt gave some advice on how to play this unusual form of the game.

1964 system
In its essentials, the 1964 system is the same as the 1929 system. However: hands are evaluated using the modern HCP method; there is an additional artificial bid (2,recommended for experts only); and some later-devised but by then well-established artificial bids are added (Stayman, Gerber, and Blackwood).

 1about 16+, at least 5 offensive playing tricks
 1 responseartificial, denying a hand which includes AA, KKK, AKQ or KKQQ anywhere, and any suit as good as AKxxxx
 Other responses (including 2)natural, having one of those holdings or better
 12natural, limited by the failure to open 1
 1N16–18 balanced
 2(for experts only) artificial, FG, asking for specific aces; opener can subsequently ask for specific kings and queens
 2 (and in non-expert use, 2)weak two bids
 2N21–22 balanced
 3solid 7-card suit, inviting 3N
 37 playing tricks, the suit need not be solid
 3N8 or 9 probable tricks, most of them in the minor suits

A 1966 edition of the Official Encyclopedia of Bridge named Vanderbilt's 1964 book as one of the "mandatory requirements for a modern technical bridge library".

Notes

References

 

Bridge systems